HD 155358 c is an extrasolar planet orbiting the star HD 155358 located 142 light years away in the constellation Hercules. This is a gas giant which orbits at 1.224 AU and takes 530.3 days to orbit HD 155358. This planet orbits in an eccentric orbit. This planet has at least half the mass of Jupiter.

See also 
 HD 155358 b

References

External links 
 The Extrasolar Planets Encyclopaedia: HD 155358 c

Hercules (constellation)
Exoplanets discovered in 2007
Giant planets
Exoplanets detected by radial velocity

es:HD 155358#Sistema planetario